The white-streaked antvireo or white-spotted antvireo (Dysithamnus leucostictus) is a species of bird in the family Thamnophilidae. It is found in Colombia, Ecuador, Peru, and Venezuela. Its natural habitat is subtropical or tropical moist montane forests.

The white-streaked antvireo was described by the English zoologist Philip Sclater in 1858 and given the binomial name Dysithamnus leucostictus. The specific name is from the Ancient Greek leukos "white" and stiktos  "spotted".

There are two recognised subspecies:
 D. l. tucuyensis Hartert, 1894 – north Venezuela
 D. l. leucostictus Sclater, PL, 1858 – east Colombia to north Peru

The coastal Venezuelan race is sometimes given specific status as the Venezuelan antvireo (Dysithamnus tucuyensis).

References

External links
Xeno-canto: audio recordings of the white-streaked antvireo

white-streaked antvireo
Birds of the Colombian Andes
Birds of the Ecuadorian Andes
Birds of the Venezuelan Andes
white-streaked antvireo
white-streaked antvireo
Taxonomy articles created by Polbot